Christian Jacob may refer to:

 Christian Jacob (musician) (born 1958), French jazz pianist
 Christian Jacob (politician) (born 1959), former Minister of French Civil Service